Julius Tyrone Robertson (born August 15, 1979) is a former professional American football player who played defensive tackle for one season for the Buffalo Bills of the National Football League (NFL).

Professional career
Robertson was drafted in the seventh round of the 2001 NFL Draft by the Buffalo Bills. He played in twelve games during his rookie season, recording two sacks and 26 total tackles. He was declared inactive for the first four weeks of the 2002 NFL season, before being suspended for the next four games by the NFL for a repeated violation of the league's substance abuse policy. Robertson's suspension ended on October 28, 2002, and he was subsequently placed on the team's reserve/non-football illness list, where he spent six weeks. On December 10, 2002, the NFL announced that Robertson was suspended for one year for another violation of the substance abuse policy. He remained on the reserve/suspended list until being officially released from it on April 15, 2016.

Legal issues
On November 22, 2004, Robertson was arrested and charged with possession of marijuana and cocaine with the intent to distribute, as well as the possession of a firearm at a Ramada Inn in Danville, Virginia.

Notes

References

1979 births
Living people
Sportspeople from Danville, Virginia
Players of American football from Virginia
American football defensive tackles
Hinds Eagles football players
Georgia Bulldogs football players
Buffalo Bills players